Gloucester High School can refer to:

Gloucester High School (Ottawa), Ontario, Canada
Gloucester High School (Massachusetts), in Gloucester, Massachusetts, USA
Gloucester High School (Virginia), in Gloucester, Virginia, USA